The 1928–29 Scottish Second Division was won by Dundee United who, along with second placed Morton, were promoted to the First Division.

Table

References 

 Scottish Football Archive

Scottish Division Two seasons
2
Scot